The black-crested antshrike (Sakesphorus canadensis) is a passerine bird in the antbird family. It is a resident breeder in tropical South America in Trinidad, Colombia, Venezuela, the Guianas, northern Brazil and northeastern Peru. It is unclear whether the species also occurs south of the Amazon in Brazil.

Taxonomy
In 1760 the French zoologist Mathurin Jacques Brisson included a description of the black-crested antshrike in his Ornithologie based on a specimen that he mistakenly believed had been collected in Canada. He used the French name La Pie-Griesche de Canada and the Latin name Lanius Canadensis. Although Brisson coined Latin names, these do not conform to the binomial system and are not recognised by the International Commission on Zoological Nomenclature. When in 1766 the Swedish naturalist Carl Linnaeus updated his Systema Naturae for the twelfth edition he added 240 species that had been previously described by Brisson in his Ornithologie. One of these was the black-crested antshrike. Linnaeus included a brief description, used the binomial name Lanius canadensis and cited Brisson's work. This species is now placed in the genus Sakesphorus that was erected by the British ornithologist Charles Chubb in 1918. Six subspecies are recognised.

Description
The adult male has a black head, prominent crest, throat and breast, a rufous-brown back, black wings with white feather edges, a short black tail and a white belly. The female and immature males have a chestnut crest and head with black and white barring on the cheeks, dull brown upperparts, black-streaked buff underparts, and browner wing and tail feathers than the male.

Distribution and habitat
This is a bird of undergrowth in mangrove or other swampy forest and thickets near water. It is usually found as territorial pairs.

Behaviour
The female lays two purple-lined white eggs in a deep cup nest suspended below a branch or vine. They are incubated by both sexes for 14 days to hatching, the female always brooding at night. The chicks fledge in another 12 days.

The black-crested antshrike feeds on insects and other arthropods gleaned from foliage. It will also take small lizards and berries. It is an inconspicuous species, often first located by its song, an accelerating and ascending series of musical notes , or the call, a snarled  .

References

black-crested antshrike
Birds of the Amazon Basin
Birds of Colombia
Birds of Venezuela
Birds of the Guianas
Birds of the Peruvian Amazon
Birds of Trinidad and Tobago
black-crested antshrike
black-crested antshrike